Aston Kajara is a Ugandan lawyer and politician. He is the current State Minister of Finance for Privatization in the Ugandan Cabinet. He was appointed to that position on 27 May 2011. In the cabinet reshuffle of 1 March 2015, he retained his cabinet post. Prior to that, from 16 February 2009 until 1 March 2015, he served as the State Minister of Finance for Investments. He is also the elected Member of Parliament (MP), representing Mwenge County South Kyenjojo District. He has represented that constituency in parliament from 2001 until 2006 and from 2011 until now.

Background and education
He was born in Kyenjojo District on 19 September 1956. He attended Kyenjojo Primary School. He transferred to Nyakasura School in Fort Portal,  for both his O-Level and A-Level studies. Aston Kajara studied law at Makerere University, Uganda's oldest university, earning the degree of Bachelor of Laws (LLB). He also holds the Diploma in Legal Practice, from the Law Development Center, in Kampala, Uganda's capital city.

Work experience
Between 1983 until 1988, Aston Kajara worked in the Ministry of Finance, as a Customs Officer. From 1988 until 1990, he served as Board Member and Company Secretary at Uganda Motors Limited, a Ugandan automobile and industrial machinery distributing company, based in Kampala. Between 1992 and 1995, he served as Principal Revenue Officer at the Uganda Revenue Authority.

In 1994, he was elected to the Constituent Assembly which drafted the 1995 Ugandan constitution. In 1995, he went into private legal practice as a Partner at Kajara, Kabiito & Company Advocates, also in Kampala. He maintained his law practice until 2001. In 1996 he contested for the parliamentary seat of Mwenge County South in Kyenjojo District. He won and served as the MP that constituency until 2001. In 2002, he became a Legal Consultant at his legal firm whose name had now changed to Kateeba, Runyangira & Kajara Advocates. In 2006, he regained his parliamentary seat of Mwenge County South. He was also appointed State Minister for Karamoja Affairs, serving in that position until his appointment to his current cabinet post in February 2009. In 2011, he was re-elected to parliament.

Personal details
Aston Kajara is married. He  enjoys social networking, sports and travel.

See also
 Parliament of Uganda
 Cabinet of Uganda
 Kyenjojo District

References

External links
 Parliament of Uganda Website
 Full Ministerial Cabinet List May 2011

1956 births
Living people
People from Kyenjojo District
20th-century Ugandan lawyers
Makerere University alumni
Members of the Parliament of Uganda
Government ministers of Uganda
People from Western Region, Uganda
21st-century Ugandan politicians